Taleqan-ye Do (meaning "Taleqan 2", also Romanized as Ţāleqān-ye Do and Ţāleghānī-ye Do) is a village in Kashkan Rural District, Shahivand District, Dowreh County, Lorestan Province, Iran. At the 2006 census, its population was 273, in 56 families.

References 

Towns and villages in Dowreh County